Lyngen is a municipality in Troms og Finnmark county, Norway. The administrative centre of the municipality is the village of Lyngseidet. Other villages include Furuflaten, Lattervika, Nord-Lenangen, and Svensby.

The  municipality is the 141st largest by area out of the 356 municipalities in Norway. Lyngen is the 240th most populous municipality in Norway with a population of 2,729.

General information

The parish of Lyngen was established as a municipality on 1 January 1838 (see formannskapsdistrikt law). On 1 January 1867, the southern part of Karlsøy Municipality (population: 862) surrounding the Sørfjorden (innermost part of the Ullsfjorden) was transferred to Lyngen.

Then on 1 January 1875, a small part of Lyngen (population: 7) was transferred to the neighboring Balsfjord Municipality. On 1 January 1902, the Sørfjorden area (population: 1,139) was separated from Lyngen to form a new municipality called Sørfjord. This left Lyngen Municipality with 5,102 residents. In 1929, the large municipality of Lyngen was divided into three parts. The northwestern part (population: 2,225) remained as Lyngen municipality. The northeastern part (population: 2,482) became the new Kåfjord Municipality. The southern part (population: 1,499) became the new Storfjord Municipality.

During the 1960s, there were many municipal mergers across Norway due to the work of the Schei Committee. On 1 January 1964, the municipality of Lyngen (population: 2,761) was merged with the northern part of the Lyngen peninsula that was part of Karlsøy Municipality (population: 1,001) and with the Svensby area of Ullsfjord Municipality (population: 171) to form a new, larger Lyngen Municipality. Then on 1 January 1992, the part of Lyngen Municipality located on the eastern shore of the Lyngenfjorden was removed from Lyngen. The Nordnes village area (population: 38) in the northern part of this area was transferred to the neighboring Kåfjord Municipality, and the unpopulated southern part was transferred to the neighboring Storfjord Municipality.

On 1 January 2020, the municipality became part of the newly formed Troms og Finnmark county. Previously, it had been part of the old Troms county.

Name
The municipality is named after the Lyngen fjord (Old Norse: Lygnir). The name of the fjord is derived from the word logn which means "quiet", "still", or "calm".

Coat of arms
The coat of arms was granted on 11 September 1987. The official blazon is "Argent, a horse forcene regardant sable". This means the arms have a field (background) with a tincture of argent which means it is commonly colored white, but if it is made out of metal, then silver is used. The charge is a black horse (specifically, a local breed called Lyngshest). The horse is standing on its hind legs and it's head is turned so it is looking backwards. The silver or white color in the field symbolizes the importance of the sea and fishing industry and the horse represents the local agriculture. The arms were designed by Arvid Sveen.

Churches
The Church of Norway has one parish within the municipality of Lyngen. It is part of the Nord-Troms prosti (deanery) in the Diocese of Nord-Hålogaland.

History

The Lyngen Church was built at Karnes in 1731, and was moved to its present location at Lyngseidet in 1740. In 1775, the church was rebuilt in its current cruciform shape, with the material from the old church used for a boathouse in Oldervik. Finally in 1840–1845, the church was renovated with a new tower, galleries, windows and panelling.

Other interesting buildings include the large wooden school in Solhov, which was built in 1924 to strengthen the Norwegian influence in this area which was largely populated by the Sami and Kven people.

Lyngen has also lent its name to the Lyngen line, a defensive line at the pinch point between the Lyngen fjord and the mountains. The line was first established during the German occupation of Norway and the main purpose was to halt a Soviet invasion. During the Cold War the Norwegian Army continued to reinforce the Lyngen lined against a possible invasion from the east. However, there were always worries that the Soviets could also advance through Finland and the sparsely defended extreme north of Sweden (north of Kiruna, south of Treriksröset) and attack the Lyngen position from the rear via Signaldalen.

Geography

The municipality is situated on the Lyngen peninsula, with the Lyngen fjord to the east and Ullsfjorden to the west. The municipal centre is the village of Lyngseidet, a pretty settlement on an isthmus that almost cuts the peninsula in the middle. Other villages include Furuflaten, which has various industries, and Svensby. Nord-Lenangen faces the open sea, and is largely a fishing village. The municipality has its own shipping company, operating the car ferries west to Breivikeidet in Tromsø and east to Olderdalen in Kåfjord meeting European route E6. There is also a road going south along the shore of the fjord connecting to the main E6 road, giving ferry-free access to the main road network.

The Lyngen peninsula is a very scenic and mountainous area, known as the Lyngen Alps, with the highest peaks in Troms county. The highest peak is Jiehkkevárri, reaching . Another prominent mountain is Store Lenangstind. The Strupbreen lies in this mountain range, northwest of Lyngseidet. The Lyngen Alps are presently being discovered by off-piste skiers from around the world.

Climate

Winters in Lyngen are long and snow-rich, but not very cold considering the very northerly latitude.

In the mountains of the Lyngen Alps, the average temperatures typically remain below freezing from October to May, and snow accumulation can exceed

Government
All municipalities in Norway, including Lyngen, are responsible for primary education (through 10th grade), outpatient health services, senior citizen services, unemployment and other social services, zoning, economic development, and municipal roads. The municipality is governed by a municipal council of elected representatives, which in turn elect a mayor.  The municipality falls under the Nord-Troms District Court and the Hålogaland Court of Appeal.

Municipal council
The municipal council  of Lyngen is made up of 19 representatives that are elected to four year terms. The party breakdown of the council is as follows:

Notable people 

 Just Knud Qvigstad (1853 in Lyngseidet – 1957) a Norwegian philologist, linguist, ethnographer, historian and cultural historian; headmaster in Tromsø and Mayor of Tromsø
 Joachim Giæver (1856 in Jøvik – 1925) an American civil engineer, designed major structures in the USA
 Leonhard Seppala (1877 in Lyngen – 1967) a sled dog breeder, trainer and musher, competed in the 1932 Winter Olympics
 Ola Krogseng Giæver (1885 in Lyngseidet – 1945) a farmer and politician, Mayor of Lyngen for four periods 1913-1925
 Ingvald Jaklin (1896 in Lyngen – 1966) a Norwegian politician and Mayor of Tromsø 
 Runo Isaksen (born 1968 in Lyngen) a Norwegian writer
 Trond Olsen (born 1984 in Lyngen) a Norwegian former footballer with over 400 club caps
 Maria Nysted Grønvoll (born 1985 in Furuflaten) a retired Norwegian cross-country skier

References

External links
Municipal fact sheet from Statistics Norway 

 
Municipalities of Troms og Finnmark
1838 establishments in Norway